Charles Macdonald Marshall (born 10 May 1961 in Bermuda) is a Bermudian cricketer. He is a left-handed batsman and a left-arm medium pace bowler. He has played 16 List A matches in the Red Stripe Bowl for Bermuda, and also represented Bermuda in four ICC Trophy tournaments and the 2004 ICC Americas Championship. He was set to play in a fifth ICC Trophy in 2005, but was axed from the squad due to disciplinary issues.

References
Article about Marshall's comeback attempt

1961 births
Living people
Bermudian cricketers
People from Hamilton Parish